Dubai Drydocks is a dry docks facility located adjacent to Port Rashid in Dubai, United Arab Emirates. The idea for Dubai Drydocks began in 1971. After feasibility studies and construction, the facility opened in 1983. It is the only large dry docks facility in the Persian Gulf. Since it opened, the yard has repaired over 6000 vessels with a combined tonnage of 500 million tons. The Dubai Drydocks have been building new ships since 1994, and have since completed over 70 projects. The dry dock also contains the Middle East's largest floating crane. Dubai Drydocks is located adjacent to Dubai Maritime City and Port Rashid (Mina Rashid).

There was a massive accident in 2002. 29 workers died after the water started to enter the drydocks when the locks somehow failed.

References

External links
Dubai Drydocks official website

Dubai World
Shipyards of the United Arab Emirates
Buildings and structures in Dubai
Economy of Dubai
Drydocks
Emirati companies established in 1983
Manufacturing companies established in 1983